Joshua Ishaele Jacob-Heron Laurent (born 6 May 1995) is an English professional footballer who plays as a midfielder for Stoke City.

Club career

Early career
Laurent was born in Leytonstone and attended Beal High School. Laurent began his career in the youth systems at Chelsea, Redbridge (where his father Burt was coach) and Wycombe Wanderers and signed a scholarship deal with the latter club in 2011. After a trial with Premier League giants Liverpool,

Queens Park Rangers
Laurent moved into the academy at Queens Park Rangers prior to the beginning of the 2012–13 season. made 20 appearances in the youth team's victorious 2012–13 Professional U18 Development League 2 campaign and played the full 90 minutes of the 1–0 win over Huddersfield Town in the final. Laurent signed his first professional contract in May 2013, a one-year deal. Laurent continued to play in the Development Squad through the 2013–14 and 2014–15 seasons. 

Laurent signed for Conference Premier side Braintree Town on a one-month loan on 17 February 2014. He made the first senior appearance of his career with a start in a 2–2 draw with Kidderminster Harriers five days later. Laurent won praise for his performances from manager Alan Devonshire and remained at Cressing Road for a second month, before departing after his 16th appearance on 12 April.

He departed QPR on 14 January 2015. The departure of Laurent caused a "reaction" at Loftus Road, with the supporters questioning the club's commitment to its younger players. On 23 January, Rangers' Head of Football Operations Les Ferdinand revealed that he had been unable to convince Laurent that there was a pathway from the Development Squad to the first team.

Brentford
On 14 January 2015, Laurent moved across West London to sign for Championship side Brentford on a one-and-a-half-year Development Squad deal for an undisclosed fee. He made his only first team appearance in the League Cup first round versus Oxford United on 11 August, playing the full 90 minutes of the 4–0 defeat. Laurent failed to feature in another first team squad before his contract was terminated by mutual consent on 1 February 2016. He made 21 appearances and scored five goals for the Development Squad.

Laurent signed for League Two side Newport County on a 28-day youth loan on 19 August 2015, which was later extended to 14 October. He made his debut (the first Football League appearance of his career) as a 74th-minute substitute for Scott Boden in a 3–2 defeat to Leyton Orient three days later. He made his first start for the club on 1 September, playing the opening 73 minutes of the Exiles' shootout defeat to Swindon Town in the Football League Trophy first round. Laurent was left out of incoming manager John Sheridan's first squad on 3 October and was recalled by Brentford five days later, having made four appearances.

Hartlepool United
On 1 February 2016, Laurent joined League Two club Hartlepool United on a free transfer. Laurent scored his first and only goal for the club in a 3–1 defeat to Leyton Orient on 22 October 2016 and remained with the club until February 2017, by which time he had made 33 appearances.

Wigan Athletic
On 1 February 2017, Laurent joined Championship club Wigan Athletic on a two-and-a-half-year contract for an undisclosed fee. He made just one appearance before the end of the 2016–17 season, at the end of which the Latics were relegated to League One. He scored his only goal for Wigan in a 2–1 EFL Cup win against Blackpool on 8 August 2017. On 31 August 2017, Bury signed Laurent on loan for the rest of the 2017–18 season. He played 22 games for the Shakers scoring once as they suffered relegation to League Two.

Shrewsbury Town
On 23 July 2018, Laurent joined League One side Shrewsbury Town on a two-year deal. He was a first-team regular during his first season at the club, making a notable contribution in the third-round of the FA Cup, where he both won the penalty that led to Shrewsbury's equaliser and then went on to score the winning goal against Championship side Stoke City. Laurent became a free agent after his contract expired at the end of the 2019–20 EFL League One season.

Reading
On 28 July 2020, Laurent joined Championship club Reading on a two-year contract. He scored his first goal for Reading in a 4–2 win over Blackburn Rovers on 27 October 2020.

Prior to Reading's last game of the 2020–21 season, on 8 May 2021, Laurent was announced as the clubs player of the season.

Stoke City
On 21 June 2022, Laurent joined Stoke City a three-year contract. He scored his first goal for Stoke on 29 January 2023 in an FA Cup tie against Stevenage.

Personal life
Born in England, Laurent is of Dominican descent.

Career statistics

Honours
Individual
 Reading Player of the Season: 2020–21

References

External links

1995 births
Living people
English footballers
English sportspeople of Jamaican descent
Association football midfielders
Brentford F.C. players
Queens Park Rangers F.C. players
Wycombe Wanderers F.C. players
Braintree Town F.C. players
National League (English football) players
People from Leytonstone
Newport County A.F.C. players
Hartlepool United F.C. players
Wigan Athletic F.C. players
Bury F.C. players
Stoke City F.C. players
Association football central defenders
English Football League players
Black British sportspeople